0O (zero O) or 0-O may refer to:

0o, 0_o, and 0.o, a kaomoji emoticon that may refer to shocked, disturbed, or confused.
0-O, abbreviation for 0-operand instruction set
0o, or zero object, a mathematics term for a simultaneously initial and terminal object
0O, also ZO, an abbreviation for zero order
Zero-order hold, model of the practical signal reconstruction done by a conventional digital-to-analog converter
Zero order process (chemistry), a chemical reaction in which the rate of change of concentration is independent of the concentrations
Zeroth-order logic, first-order logic without quantifiers
Zero-order process (statistics), a sequence of random variables, each independent of the previous ones
Zeroth-order approximation, an approximation of a function by a constant
0o, a prefix used in some programming languages to denote octal (base 8) integer literals

See also
O0 (disambiguation)
00 (disambiguation)
OO (disambiguation)